"Tell It to the Rain" is a song composed by Mike Petrillo and Chubby Cifelli and popularized by The Four Seasons in 1966 and early 1967. The single reached the #10 position on the Billboard Hot 100 singles chart.

The song's arrangement includes a prominent 12-string electric guitar part, as well as sound effects and a crescendo of vocals toward the end.

Cash Box said the single is "loaded with the group’s usual effective sound and infectious arrangement."

Chart history

(* - Canadian RPM chart data incomplete for early 1967)

References

1966 songs
1966 singles
The Four Seasons (band) songs
Philips Records singles
Song recordings produced by Bob Crewe